Isabelle Nicoloso-Verger (born 13 February 1961 in Domont) is a French track cyclist.

At the 1983 Summer Universiade she won on the track the gold medal in the women's points race and silver medals in the women's sprint and the women's 500 m time trial.

Honours
 World Speed Champion: 1985 (3rd : 1983)
 Speed Champion of France: 1991
 Champion of France over the kilometre: 1990
 Prix des Forges : 2000
 Vice-champion of France on track points: 2000
 Bronze medal at the France speed championships: 1989

Doping
In 1987, she tested positive the week of the federal track championships. She served a six-month suspension and a 1000 FF fine (around 150 €).

References

External links

1961 births
Living people
People from Domont
French female cyclists
UCI Track Cycling World Champions (women)
Universiade medalists in cycling
French track cyclists
Sportspeople from Val-d'Oise
Universiade gold medalists for France
Medalists at the 1983 Summer Universiade
Cyclists from Île-de-France